Peter Kienast (sometimes listed as Pieter Kienast; 30 March 1949 – 12 December 1991) was an Austrian bobsledder who competed during the 1980s. He was born in Ellbögen, Tyrol. He won a silver medal in the four-man event at the 1986 FIBT World Championships in Königssee. Competing in two Winter Olympics, Kienast earned his best finish of sixth in the four-man event at Calgary in 1988. In the 1987-88 Bobsleigh World Cup, he tied for overall champion in the four-man event with fellow Austrian Ingo Appelt.

References
1984 bobsleigh two-man results
1984 bobsleigh four-man results
1988 bobsleigh two-man results
1988 bobsleigh four-man results
Bobsleigh four-man world championship medalists since 1930
List of four-man bobsleigh World Cup champions since 1985
Peter Kienast's biography at Munzinger 

1949 births
1991 deaths
Austrian male bobsledders
Bobsledders at the 1984 Winter Olympics
Bobsledders at the 1988 Winter Olympics
Olympic bobsledders of Austria